Enterprise was an unincorporated community in Shasta County, California. It was annexed into the city of Redding, California  by voters in the November 2, 1976 election. The annexation was hotly contested as reported in the Redding Record Searchlight.

It lies at an elevation of 538 feet (164 m).

References

Unincorporated communities in Shasta County, California
Unincorporated communities in California